Hydriomena edenata is a species of geometrid moth in the family Geometridae. It is found in North America.

The MONA or Hodges number for Hydriomena edenata is 7232.

Subspecies
These seven subspecies belong to the species Hydriomena edenata:
 Hydriomena edenata baueri McDunnough, 1954
 Hydriomena edenata edenata
 Hydriomena edenata grandis Barnes & McDunnough, 1917
 Hydriomena edenata indistincta McDunnough, 1952
 Hydriomena edenata olivata Wright, 1916
 Hydriomena edenata pallidata Wright, 1916
 Hydriomena edenata prasinata McDunnough, 1954

References

Further reading

External links

 

Hydriomena
Articles created by Qbugbot
Moths described in 1909